The Vektor Z88 ("Z-88") is a 9mm semi-automatic pistol produced by Vektor, the small arms brand name of Denel Land Systems, in South Africa. It is a licensed copy of the Beretta 92F. The gun was developed into the Vektor SP1, released in January 1993. The gun was predominantly used by the South African Police Service. The Z88 is implicated heavily in gang crime in South Africa; this is reportedly due to stolen firearms from police armouries.

References

9mm Parabellum semi-automatic pistols
Police weapons
Semi-automatic pistols of South Africa
Denel